Perenniporia nanlingensis is a poroid fungus first isolated from Guangdong Province, China. It has crust-like fruit bodies with a pinkish pore surface when in dry condition. Microscopically, it has a trimitic hyphal system, a slightly dextrinoid and binding hyphae. Its basidiospores are ellipsoid, truncate, and measure 9.0–9.8 by 5.0–5.9 μm.

References

Perenniporia
Fungi described in 2012
Fungi of China
Taxa named by Bao-Kai Cui